The 3rd constituency of the Hauts-de-Seine is a French legislative constituency in the Hauts-de-Seine département.  It is represented in the XVIth legislature by Philippe Juvin of LR.

Description

Hauts-de-Seine's 3rd constituency lies in the north of the department around Courbevoie situated 8.2 km to the west of central Paris. The seat is urban in character and is densely packed on the western side of the Seine on the opposite bank to Neuilly-sur-Seine. The constituency also includes part of La Défense the business district which serves the capital.

The seat has elected conservative deputies without interruption since 1988, however between 1973 and 1986 and seat elected a deputy from the French Communist Party. In recent years the seat has become very safe for the Gaullist right with the UMP candidate winning in the first round in 2002 and 2007.

Historic Representative

Election results

2022

 
 
 
 
 
 
|-
| colspan="8" bgcolor="#E9E9E9"|
|-

2017

 
 
 
 
 
 
 
|-
| colspan="8" bgcolor="#E9E9E9"|
|-

2012

 
 
 
 
 
 
|-
| colspan="8" bgcolor="#E9E9E9"|
|-

2007

2002

 
 
 
 
|-
| colspan="8" bgcolor="#E9E9E9"|
|-

1997

 
 
 
 
 
 
 
 
 
|-
| colspan="8" bgcolor="#E9E9E9"|
|-
 
 

 
 
 
 
 
 

* RPR dissident

Sources

 Official results of French elections from 1998: 

3